Nodina is a genus of leaf beetles in the subfamily Eumolpinae. It is distributed in Asia.

Species

 Nodina aeneicollis Jacoby, 1895
 Nodina alpicola Weise, 1889
 Nodina baliana Medvedev & Takizawa, 2011
 Nodina balyi Jacoby, 1896
 Nodina belgaumensis Jacoby, 1908
 Nodina bicoloripes Medvedev, 2015
 Nodina birmanica Jacoby, 1892
 Nodina brevicostata Jacoby, 1896
 Nodina celebensis Jacoby, 1885
 Nodina ceramensis Baly, 1867
 Nodina ceylonensis Jacoby, 1908
 Nodina chalcosoma Baly, 1874
 Nodina chinensis Weise, 1922
 Nodina cibulskisi Medvedev, 2013
 Nodina clypeata Kimoto & Gressitt, 1982
 Nodina coerulea Chen, 1940
 Nodina cyanea Chen, 1940
 Nodina dhadinga Medvedev, 1992
 Nodina fulvipes Baly, 1867
 Nodina fulvitarsis Jacoby, 1896
 Nodina gigas Baly, 1867
 Nodina hongshana Gressitt & Kimoto, 1961
 Nodina hirta Jacoby, 1908
 Nodina issikii Chûjô, 1956
 Nodina kraussi Kimoto & Gressitt, 1966
 Nodina laevicollis Motschulsky, 1858
 Nodina laotica Medvedev, 2000
 Nodina liui Gressitt & Kimoto, 1961
 Nodina luzonica Weise, 1922
 Nodina malayana Bryant, 1941
 Nodina malayana Medvedev, 2016 (homonym)
 Nodina mandibularis Medvedev, 2015
 Nodina martensi Medvedev, 1992
 Nodina mengi Medvedev, 2015
 Nodina meridiosinica Gressitt & Kimoto, 1961
 Nodina minuta Baly, 1867
 Nodina minutissima Kimoto & Gressitt, 1982
 Nodina morimotoi Kimoto & Gressitt, 1966
 Nodina nepalensis Takizawa, 1987
 Nodina nigrilabris Jacoby, 1908
 Nodina nigripes Jacoby, 1896
 Nodina obliquocostata Medvedev, 2011
 Nodina parva Gressitt & Kimoto, 1961
 Nodina parvula Jacoby, 1892
 Nodina philippina Medvedev, 1995
 Nodina pilifrons Chen, 1940
 Nodina polilovi Medvedev, 2010
 Nodina punctostriolata (Fairmaire, 1888)
 Nodina pusilla Motschulsky, 1858
 Nodina robusta Jacoby, 1892
 Nodina rufipes Jacoby, 1908
 Nodina santula Weise, 1922
 Nodina sauteri Chûjô, 1956
 Nodina separata Baly, 1867
 Nodina similis Kimoto & Gressitt, 1982
 Nodina sphaerica Chen, 1940
 Nodina striopunctata Tan, 1988
 Nodina subcostata Jacoby, 1908
 Nodina subdiliata Motschulsky, 1858
 Nodina sumatrana Jacoby, 1896
 Nodina taliana Chen, 1940
 Nodina tarsalis Duvivier, 1892
 Nodina thaiensis Chûjô, 1960
 Nodina tibialis Chen, 1940
 Nodina tricarinata Gressitt & Kimoto, 1961
 Nodina tricostata Jacoby, 1894
 Nodina tricostata Takizawa, 2017 (homonym?)

Synonyms:
 Nodina chinensis Bryant, 1924 (preoccupied by N. chinensis Weise, 1922): synonym of Nodina punctostriolata (Fairmaire, 1888)
 Nodina crassipes Jacoby, 1908: synonym of Nodina robusta Jacoby, 1892
 Nodina fulvicollis Jacoby, 1899: moved to Aulacia
 Nodina indica Jacoby, 1895: synonym of Nodina robusta Jacoby, 1892
 Nodina major Kimoto & Gressitt, 1982: synonym of Nodina robusta Jacoby, 1892
 Nodina metallica Bryant, 1937: synonym of Nodina punctostriolata (Fairmaire, 1888)
 Nodina rotundata Motschulsky, 1858: synonym of Nodina subdiliata Motschulsky, 1858

References

Eumolpinae
Chrysomelidae genera
Beetles of Asia
Taxa named by Victor Motschulsky